The following table includes players who have captained the United States men's national soccer team (featuring all caps, goals and assists or goalkeeper wins and shutouts) from April 16, 1989, through February 2, 2022, a game with Honduras. Values come from U.S. Soccer Federation Media Guide.

All other Captain amounts from 1916 to 1988 are based on extensive research of game film, match statistics and match lineups found on numerous websites,
which have been able to place a captain with every FIFA USMNT Match.

USMNT captains

Steve Sampson stated that Thomas Dooley and John Harkes captained the majority of USMNT matches during Sampson's tenure from 1995 to 1998.

References

External links
Captain America! Players that captained USA during a World Cup
Remembering USA Soccer captains over the years

captains
United States
Association football player non-biographical articles